Chase Allen (born July 9, 1997) is an American football tight end for the Chicago Bears of the National Football League (NFL). He played college football at Iowa State.

Early life and high school
Allen grew up in Nixa, Missouri and attended Nixa Public High School. He was named first team All-State as a senior after finishing the season with 33 receptions for 654 yards and seven touchdowns. Allen committed to play college football at Iowa State over offers from Nebraska, Michigan, Missouri, and Minnesota.

College career
Allen was a member of the Iowa State Cyclones for six seasons. He redshirted his true freshman season while recovering from injuries suffered after being hit by a car shortly before graduating high school. Allen played in all 13 of Iowa State's games with nine starts during his redshirt freshman season and was named second-team All-Big 12 Conference primarily on his blocking ability. He played in eight games while missing five due to injury as a redshirt sophomore and caught eight passes for 84 yards.

As a redshirt junior, Allen played in all 13 of the Cyclones' games and had 17 receptions for 167 yards and two touchdowns and was again named second team All-Big 12. He repeated as a second team all-conference after catching 19 passes for 236 yards and two touchdowns in his redshirt senior season. Allen used the extra year of eligibility granted to college athletes in 2020 due to the COVID-19 pandemic and returned to Iowa State for a sixth year. In his final season, he caught 26 passes for 284 yards and two touchdowns and was named second team All-Big 12 for a fourth time.

Professional career
Allen signed with the Chicago Bears as an undrafted free agent on April 30, 2022. He was waived during final roster cuts on August 30, 2022, but was signed to the team's practice squad the next day. He signed a reserve/future contract on January 9, 2023.

References

External links
Iowa State Cyclones bio
Chicago Bears bio

1997 births
Living people
Players of American football from Missouri
American football tight ends
Iowa State Cyclones football players
Chicago Bears players